Anthony John Priscott (born 19 March 1941) is an English former professional footballer who played as a winger.

Portsmouth F.C.  35 appearances 6 goals

August 1962-January 1966 Aldershot F.C. 141 appearances   44 goals 

January 1966-August 1967  AFC Bournemouth     61 appearances      6 goals 
  
August 1967-July 1971 Aldershot F.C. (2nd spell) 136 appearances     26 goals 

FOOTBALL LEAGUE TOTAL  372 appearances    82 goals 

July 1971-June 1973    Poole Town  59 appearances  3 goals.

June 1973 Ringwood Town Data not found

On Saturday 20 January 2007, The News (Portsmouth, UK) Sports Mail Edition featured Priscott in its "Where are they now?" column. He is now a Christian minister.

References

1941 births
Living people
AFC Bournemouth players
Aldershot F.C. players
Portsmouth F.C. players
English Christian religious leaders
Poole Town F.C. players
English footballers
English Football League players
Association football wingers
People from Eastleigh
Ringwood Town F.C. players